Arturo Castro may refer to:
 Arturo Castro (Mexican actor) (1918–1975)
 Arturo Castro (Guatemalan actor) (born 1985)